Chris Tugwell is an Australian dramatist, screenwriter and author of English descent. Best known as a playwright, his most successful play was X-Ray, which he also produced. He was originally a dancer and actor, performing with some of Australia's most prominent Theatre-in-Education companies, before turning to writing full-time. Tugwell is also a teacher of screenwriting and the author of the textbook Dinosaur Theory.

Early life
Tugwell was born in England and moved to Australia with his family when he was seven. His father was a successful architect and his mother was an amateur opera singer. He attended private schools in Adelaide and then Flinders University Drama Centre, where he studied acting with Zora Semberova and Yutaka Wada. While still at university he performed as a dancer with the E-Motion Dance Company in works by choreographer Moshe Kedem and in the New Opera production Renard the Fox. His sister Sally was a founding member of the Australian Dance Theatre and later performed with Circus Oz.

Career
Chris taught high school English and Drama in the regional city of Whyalla, where he also wrote his first play. He returned to Adelaide and worked as an actor, writer and director with a number of theatre-in-education companies, performing in hundreds of schools across South Australia. His most notable appearance was in Magpie's world première season of British playwright David Holman's No Worries at the 1984 Adelaide Festival. He turned to full-time writing in 1984.

He has written more than fifty scripts for film, stage, radio, television, documentary and multimedia. His work has been performed by such companies as Patch Theatre, Urban Myth, Magpie Theatre Company and The Acting Company. His play Seasonally Adjusted was a showcase work at the 1987 Come Out Festival. In 1984, Runaway toured regional NSW for twelve months.

Tugwell was a writer for the highly successful ABC children's TV series Finders Keepers (1991), directed by Scott Hicks. His first novel for teenagers, Kid Brother, was published in 1994 and he was awarded the Carclew Fellowship (for writers for young people) at the 1996 Adelaide Festival of Arts.

His stage play X Ray, about the plight of Australian David Hicks held in Guantanamo Bay detention camp, was named the 'sensation' of the 2004 Adelaide Fringe Festival and the 'highlight' of the 2005 Darwin Festival. A US production opened in November 2005. A radio adaptation, commissioned by the ABC, went to air on Radio National's Airplay in November 2004 and was repeated in the 2005 and 2006 summer seasons

He was a member of the South Australian Committee of the Australian Writers' Guild for sixteen years, and chair from 1996 to 2005. He was on the National Executive from 1992 to 1996, and was a founding board member of the Australian Writers' Guild Authorship Collecting Society (AWGACS), and chair from 2004 to 2007. He was made a Life Member of the Guild in 2012.

Tugwell also served on the board of the Australian Script Centre for six years.

Chris has run writing workshops around South Australia, including the well-regarded screenwriting course Pictures on Paper, and has taught scriptwriting at the Adelaide College of the Arts since 1998. He has worked as a script consultant and dramaturg on numerous stage, feature film and TV projects and helped establish the Insite Unproduced Screenplay Competition for the Adelaide Film Festival. His book Dinosaur Theory – uncovering a new approach to screenwriting (2012) is a distillation of 25 years as a teacher, editor and screenwriter.

In 2014 he produced, wrote and directed the short film Bastard.

Works

Plays
 2011: Finding Home
 2003: X Ray
 1995: River of Dreams
 1994: Landings
 1991: Finders Keepers, parts 3 & 5 (television show)
 1987: Seasonally Adjusted
 1984: Runaway

Books

Awards and honours
 1996: Adelaide Festival Literary Awards – Carclew Fellowship

External links
 Australian Plays, Chris Tugwell
 
 Official website, Dinosaur Theory, by Chris Tugwell

References

Australian dramatists and playwrights
Australian screenwriters
English emigrants to Australia
Living people
People from Adelaide
Year of birth missing (living people)
21st-century Australian screenwriters